Land's End is a headland on the Penwith peninsula, located near Penzance in Cornwall, England, United Kingdom. 

Lands' End is a clothing retailer.

Land's End, Lands End, or Lands' End may also refer to:

Places

United States
Land's End Plantation (Scott, Arkansas), listed on the National Register of Historic Places (NRHP)
Lands End, San Francisco, a park in San Francisco, California
Land's End Observatory, Whitewater, Colorado, NRHP-listed
Land's End Plantation (Stonewall, Louisiana), NRHP-listed
Land's End (Hertford, North Carolina), a plantation house in the NRHP
Lands End, Naxera, Virginia, in the National Register of Historic Places listings in Gloucester County, Virginia
Lands End Road Tabby Ruins, Frogmore, South Carolina, in the National Register of Historic Places listings in Beaufort County, South Carolina
Land's End Wildlife Management Area, a protected area located in King George County, Virginia

Other places
Land's End, aka Rescue Camp, the southeastern tip of King William Island, in arctic Canada
Land's End, Bandra, Mumbai, Maharashtra, India
El Arco de Cabo San Lucas or Lands End, Cabo San Lucas, Mexico
 Cape Finisterre (Fisterra or Finisterra : Latin for Land's End), headland in Galicia, northwest Spain, the Southern landfall of the Bay of Biscay
 Fisterra (comarca), comarca (county) in A Coruña, Galicia
 Fisterra, municipality in the comarca
 Finistère, department of France, the Northern landfall of the Bay of Biscay
Kanyakumari, the southernmost town in mainland India, it is sometimes referred to as 'The Land's End'.
Land's End Airport, in Cornwall, United Kingdom

Art, entertainment, and media
Land's End (album), a 1974 album by Jimmy Webb
Land's End (play), a 1935 play by F. L. Lucas
Land's End (TV series), a 1995 television series starring Fred Dryer
The Birds II: Land's End (1994), a horror film

See also
Land's End Plantation (disambiguation)
World's End (disambiguation)